Saint-Jans-Cappel is a commune in the Nord department in northern France.

Heraldry

See also
Communes of the Nord department
French Flanders

References

Saintjanscappel
Nord communes articles needing translation from French Wikipedia
French Flanders